Howard Rose may refer to:

Howie Rose
Howard Rose (musician) in The Voice UK (series 4)